Perdix is a village between the Susquehanna River and Cove Mountain in Penn Township, Perry County, Pennsylvania, United States. U.S. Route 11/15 passes through the village, which uses the Duncannon zip code of 17020.

Unincorporated communities in Pennsylvania
Unincorporated communities in Perry County, Pennsylvania